Türisalu is a village in Harku Parish, Harju County in northern Estonia. It has a population of 499 (as of 1 June 2010).

An infamous suicide place Türisalu cliff is located in the village.

See also
Keila-Joa Airfield

References

Villages in Harju County